Gueraula de Codines (1275–1340), was a Spanish folk healer.

She was a married peasant woman who lived in Subirats Alt Penedès and was active as a folk healer and a fortune teller. She enjoyed wide spread fame for her medical ability in contemporary Spain.

In 1303, a report to the Bishop of Barcelona, Ponç de Gualba, referred to her as divinatrix de parrochia de Subirat and described her popularity among the parishioners. She was questioned for sorcery and fortune telling in 1304. She used magical spells to cure both humans and animals, but also answered that she studied the urine of patients.

She said that she had been taught medicine by a trained physician. She was admonished to repentance and not to repeat her activity. She was however admonished for the same crimes in 1307 as well as in 1327, and was apparently still active and popular.

References

 «Diccionari Biogràfic de Dones: Gueraula de Codines (Geralda) »
 Pernau, Josep (1982). «Activitats i fórmules supersticioses de curació a Catalunya en la primera meitat del segle XIV». En: Arxiu de textos Catalans antics, vol.1, p. 47-77.

1275 births
1340 deaths
14th-century people from the Kingdom of Aragon
Cunning folk
Medieval occultists